Drillia aquatilis is a species of sea snail, a marine gastropod mollusk in the family Drilliidae.

Description
The solid shell is ovately turreted with an acuminated spire. The whorls are smooth, depressed round the upper part, obliquely plicately tubercled. The siphonal canal is very short. The anal sinus is large. The color of the shell is ivory-white, painted with bands of extremely fine pale horny brown waved lines.

Distribution

References

External links
  Tucker, J.K. 2004 Catalog of recent and fossil turrids (Mollusca: Gastropoda). Zootaxa 682:1–1295

aquatilis
Gastropods described in 1845